Charles Wittl (born 5 October 1971) is a retired Austrian-Ghanaian football midfielder.

References

1971 births
Living people
Austrian people of Ghanaian descent
Ghanaian footballers
Ghana international footballers
Neuchâtel Xamax FCS players
FC St. Gallen players
SK Rapid Wien players
Shandong Taishan F.C. players
FC Lausanne-Sport players
FC Aarau players
FC La Chaux-de-Fonds players
FC Biel-Bienne players
FC Serrières players
Association football midfielders
Swiss Super League players
Ghanaian expatriate footballers
Expatriate footballers in Switzerland
Ghanaian expatriate sportspeople in Switzerland
Expatriate footballers in China
Ghanaian expatriate sportspeople in China
Austrian Football Bundesliga players